Princess Trulala is a 1926 German silent comedy film directed by Erich Schönfelder and Richard Eichberg and starring Lilian Harvey, Dina Gralla and Harry Halm. It was shot at the Johannisthal Studios in Berlin. The film's sets were designed by art director Kurt Richter. As was common in her silent films, Harvey's heroine has to choose between several different suitors.

Plot
The young and wild Princess Trulala should finally get married! Her chosen one is the young and beautiful Prince Arnulf, whose father of the same name, the old Prince of Leinefeld, rules over a small empire. In order to get to know her groom better, Princess Trulala travels with her sister, Princess Hopsassa, both disguised as waitresses, to the residence of the young prince. The Prince too wants to get to know his bride better, and dresses up as a forester. Of course, as usual for a comedy of confusion of that time, this leads to all sorts of more or less funny misunderstandings.

Since the two waitresses are quite handsome, the village boys in Prince Arnulf's empire are now also beginning to develop interest in Trulala and Hopsassa, which in turn arouses plenty of displeasure among the village beauties of the country. When Trulala and Arnulf got to know each other better, they quickly take a liking to each other and want to escape the whole Tohuwabohu by tearing away to Munich. The old prince promptly leaves, believing that he has to free Arnulf junior from this improper "woman", this waitress. But eventually everything dissolves in pleasure, and Prince Arnulf gives his blessing to his son's marriage to that false "waitress", Princess Trulala. And quite en passé, the old man also finds pleasure in Trulala's sister Hopsassa, whom he finally leads home.

Cast

Reception
Writing for the Immortal Film Heinrich Fraenkel stated: "For Richard Eichberg, it was agreed that the cinema audience would love nothing more than adventurous princesses who sit on cavalier knees, drink champagne and cause teasing stirs. How much he was right when his theory was proven by the success of the film Princess Trulala".

References

External links

Films of the Weimar Republic
German comedy films
German silent feature films
Films directed by Richard Eichberg
Films directed by Erich Schönfelder
German black-and-white films
1926 comedy films
Silent comedy films
Films shot at Johannisthal Studios
1920s German films